Castanospermum australe (Moreton Bay chestnut or blackbean), the only species in the genus Castanospermum, is a flowering plant in the family Fabaceae, native to the east coast of Australia in Queensland and New South Wales, and to the Pacific islands of Vanuatu, New Caledonia, and the island of New Britain (Papua New Guinea).

Growth

Common names
The 1889 book 'The Useful Native Plants of Australia' records the common names of Castanospermum australe as "Moreton Bay Chestnut" and "Bean tree" and notes that it was called "Irtalie" by Aboriginal people of the Richmond and Clarence Rivers (New South Wales) and "Bogum" by "others of Northern New South Wales". Other names that have been used by Aboriginal peoples are:  baway, yiwurra, junggurraa, mirrayn, ganyjuu, and binyjaalga.

Uses

Chemicals
In 1981, castanospermine was isolated from the seeds.  Members of this and closely related genera accumulate iminosugars in their leaves.

Cultural significance
Due to its importance as a food, the blackbean tree was a seasonal gathering point for Aboriginal peoples, and this acted as a catalyst for ceremonies. Songlines featuring the black bean seeds have been collected.   The bark fibre has been used for fish and animal traps, nets and baskets, and the empty seed pods have been used as toy boats.  Additionally, the tree has been used as a seasonal signal for when to hunt jungle fowl.

Food
The unprocessed seeds are poisonous since they contain toxic saponins, and can cause vomiting and diarrhoea, but they become edible when carefully prepared by roasting, cutting up into small pieces, leaching with running water for several days, and pounding into flour and roasting it as a damper. The seeds have been prepared and eaten for at least 2,500 years. The 1889 book 'The Useful Native Plants of Australia' notes and describes this use of the beans.  As of 2012, the food was not used in modern bush tucker, and there was no nutritional information available on the seeds.

Ornamental use
The trees are popular as potted plants in Asia, Europe and America.  In addition, they have been used as shade trees in landscaping for parks.

Wood
The wood was used by Aboriginal people for spear throwers. The timber, which somewhat resembles walnut, is soft, fine-grained, and takes a good polish, and the wood has a durability rating above-ground of over 40 years longevity.

Spread
Due to its significance as a food for Aboriginal people, blackbean trees were spread by hand into mountain areas on the east coast of Australia.  All the trees in New South Wales are descended from a single seed.  The plant naturally spreads by water.  It has been introduced to India, Malaysia, Papua New Guinea, Sri Lanka, South Africa and the United States of America.

Gallery

References

External links

Bush Tucker Plants: Moreton Bay Chestnut

Angylocalyceae
Monotypic Fabaceae genera
Fabales of Australia
Flora of Queensland
Trees of Australia
Poisonous plants